Daryapur is a village in Shaheed Bhagat Singh Nagar district of Punjab State, India. The village is administrated by Sarpanch an elected representative of the village.

Demography 
As of 2011, Daryapur has a total number of 206 houses and population of 1218 of which 641 include are males while 577 are females according to the report published by Census India in 2011. The literacy rate of Daryapur is 80.22%, higher than the state average of 75.84%. The population of children under the age of 6 years is 146 which is 11.99% of total population of Daryapur, and child sex ratio is approximately 1116 as compared to Punjab state average of 846.

Most of the people are from Schedule Caste which constitutes 67.57% of total population in Daryapur. The town does not have any Schedule Tribe population so far.

As per the report published by Census India in 2011, 543 people were engaged in work activities out of the total population of Daryapur which includes 320 males and 223 females. According to census survey report 2011, 30.22% workers describe their work as main work and 69.80% workers are involved in Marginal activity providing livelihood for less than 6 months.

Education 
The village has a Punjabi medium, co-ed private un-aided primary with upper primary and secondary school founded in 2001. The schools does not provide mid-day meal. KC Engineering College and Doaba Khalsa Trust Group Of Institutions are the nearest colleges.

Transport 

See also 
List of villages in India

References

External links 
 Tourism of Punjab
 Census of Punjab
 Locality Based PINCode

Villages in Shaheed Bhagat Singh Nagar district